Mechanicsville is an unincorporated community in Gwinnett County, Georgia, United States, just south of Buford Highway around Button Gwinnett Road. It is located roughly 3.5 miles away from Interstate 285.

The Mechanicsville schoolhouse, built in 1911, is located at the intersection of 3rd Street and Florida Avenue. As of 2011, it was under restoration.

References

Unincorporated communities in Georgia (U.S. state)
Unincorporated communities in Gwinnett County, Georgia